KWOS (950 AM) is a radio station broadcasting a conservative talk format. Licensed to Jefferson City, Missouri, United States, the station serves the Mid-Missouri area. The station is currently owned by Zimmer Radio of Mid-Missouri, Inc and features programming from Fox News Radio, Compass Media Networks, Genesis Communications Network, Premiere Networks, USA Radio Network, and Westwood One. Syndicated programming includes The Sean Hannity Show, Coast to Coast AM and Mark Levin, and the station was formerly a longtime affiliate of The Rush Limbaugh Show. On Sundays, KWOS features religious programming of local church sermons.

History

KWOS debuted, as KLIK, in 1954. In 1999, the station swapped call letters with an existing station on AM 1240, becoming KWOS. 

The KWOS call sign referenced an earlier Jefferson City radio station, WOS, that was set up by Missouri Agriculture Commissioner Jewell A. Mayes to facilitate agricultural commerce. WOS was first licensed on February 23, 1922, and was deleted on March 27, 1936. The original KWOS on AM 1240 was established in 1937.

References

External links

 FCC History Cards for KWOS (as KLIK, covering 1951-1981)

Disambiguation
Not to be confused with KWOS.it, the Kind of Weather Observing Station site dedicated to weather instrumentation testing.

WOS
Conservative talk radio
Radio stations established in 1954
1954 establishments in Missouri